Mitsuyo (written: 美鶴代, 美津代 or 満代) is a feminine Japanese given name. Notable people with the name include:

, Japanese television presenter
, Japanese alpine skier
, Japanese actress and singer
, Japanese author

Mitsuyo (written: 光世) is also a masculine Japanese given name. Notable people with the name include:

, Japanese judoka
, Japanese animator, screenwriter and film director

Japanese feminine given names
Japanese masculine given names
Japanese unisex given names